Roselinda Soipan Tuiya is a Kenyan politician serving as Cabinet secretary for Environment and Sanitation since 2022. She is the first Masaai woman to be in the Cabinet of Kenya.

Education 
Tuiya graduated from the University of Washington and the University of Nairobi.

Political career 
Tuiya served as women's representative for Narok County from 2013 to 2022.

Family 
Tuiya is the daughter of former Narok South MP Samson Ole Tuiya.

References 

Year of birth missing (living people)
Place of birth missing (living people)
21st-century Kenyan women politicians
21st-century Kenyan politicians
Members of the 11th Parliament of Kenya
Members of the 12th Parliament of Kenya
Women government ministers of Kenya
Maasai people
University of Washington alumni
University of Nairobi alumni
Kenyan women representatives
Living people